Liffort Wayne Hobley (born May 12, 1962) is a former professional American football safety in the National Football League (NFL). Hobley attended Louisiana State University, where he played college football for the LSU Tigers football team. He was drafted in the 3rd round of the 1985 NFL Draft by the Pittsburgh Steelers and played seven seasons for the St. Louis Cardinals and the Miami Dolphins. He had two touchdowns in his professional career, both on fumble recoveries.

Hobley was born in Shreveport, Louisiana and attended C. E. Byrd High School.

References

1962 births
Living people
Players of American football from Shreveport, Louisiana
American football safeties
LSU Tigers football players
St. Louis Cardinals (football) players
Miami Dolphins players
Ed Block Courage Award recipients